is a Japanese corporation which was established in 1919. Its main areas of business are building construction and civil engineering.

Maeda has domestic offices in eleven Japanese cities, and overseas offices in Thailand, Hong Kong, and India.

History
It became known as Maeda Corporation in 1946. In 1960, the company completed Takokura Dam, one of the largest dam projects in Japan. In recent years, Maeda engaged in other large-scale public construction projects such as Seikan Tunnel and Tokyo Bay Aqua-Line in Japan.

Maeda is also well known in Hong Kong and has constructed such projects as the Hong Kong International Airport and Kap Shui Mun Bridge.

Construction projects
Not a complete list.
Kanmonkyo Bridge (1971)
Seikan Tunnel (1987)
Fukuoka Dome (1993)
Kashiwazaki-Kariwa Nuclear Power Plant (1995)
Hong Kong International Airport terminal (1998)
Blue Line (Yokohama) Shimoiida Station (1997)

References

External links
 
Official site 
Official site 
Entry in The Encyclopedia of Science Fiction

Engineering companies of Japan
Construction and civil engineering companies based in Tokyo
Construction and civil engineering companies established in 1919
Companies listed on the Tokyo Stock Exchange
Japanese brands
Fuyo Group
Japanese companies established in 1919